Jessica Jackson Hutchins (born 1971) is an American artist from Chicago, Illinois who is based in Portland, Oregon. Her practice consists of large scale ceramics, multi-media installations, assemblage, and paintings all of which utilize found objects such as old furniture, ceramics, worn out clothes, and newspaper clippings.  She is most recognizable for her sloppy craft assemblages of furniture and ceramics. Her work was selected for the 2010: Whitney Biennial, featured in major art collections, and has been exhibited throughout the United States and internationally, in Iceland, the UK, and Germany.

Life and work
Jessica Jackson Hutchins received a BA in Art History from Oberlin College, graduating Cum Laude. In 1997 she finished a  Post-Baccalaureate degree at the School of the Art Institute of Chicago. She went on to receive an MFA from The School of the Art Institute of Chicago in 1999. Though she was in the Painting and Drawing Department, she produced very little paintings as she preferred to work in wire and papier-mâché.  Hutchins studied under and was influenced by Susanne Doremus and Gaylen Gerber.

Her use of every day objects has evolved over the years based on her surroundings. In college, she incorporated beer bottles and packaging. After college, coffee cups appeared in her work. After becoming a mother, she included her children's worn-out clothing. Motherhood and her children have become some of the most influential factors in her work. Much of Hutchin's work is about the domestic sphere and human interaction with forms acting as substitutions for the human form. The furniture pieces used in her work were once in her own home.

The Portland Mercury reported in September 2006 that "her ceramics (steeped in a California funk attitude), papier-mâché sculptures, and collages share a crass aesthetic and a preoccupation with the thin line between disaster and success that disguise a genuine attempt to convey ideas about communion, fear, and loneliness." Her show at Reed College's Caseworks drew similar analysis.

Hutchins moved to Berlin in 2011 and returned to making paintings and wall-hung assemblages, having brought almost no materials with her. The paintings utilized everyday household objects such as folding chairs and china plates juxtaposed with transparent linen stretched over window-like frames.

Jessica Jackson Hutchins was included in the 2013 Venice Biennial by curator Massimiliano Gioni. In summer 2016, she was selected by artist and curator Michelle Grabner to participate in the 2016 Portland Biennial.

Personal life
Hutchins is married to Pavement frontman Stephen Malkmus. They have two children, Lottie and Sunday.

Exhibitions

2016
Columbus, OH, Columbus College of Art and Design, Beeler Gallery, Jessica Jackson Hutchins, organized by Michael Goodson, June 13 – September 10 (solo)
Portland, OR, Disjecta Contemporary Art Center, Portland2016 Biennial, curated by Michelle Grabner, July – September 
Louisville, KC, Kentucky Museum of Art and Craft, Material Issue: Subverting Form and Function
Bronx, NY, Wave Hill, Glyndor Gallery, (Not So) Still Life, April 5 – July 4
Los Angeles, CA, Redling Fine Art, April 2 – May 14
Portland, OR, Adams and Ollman, esprit: Jessica Jackson Hutchins, Matthew Kirk, Memory Jugs and Philadelphia Wireman, March 18 – April 16

2015
Stanford, CA, Cantor Arts Center at Stanford University, Oshman Family Gallery, Mining the Ancient, October 14, 2015 – August 29, 2016
Rome, Italy, Fondazione GIULIANI, Consequences, curated by Jay Heikes, October 9 – December 12
Chicago, IL, Kavi Gupta Gallery, Assisted, curated by Jessica Stockholder, September 12, 2015 – January 16, 2016
Portland, OR, The Lumber Room and The Cooley Gallery at Reed College, Jessica Jackson Hutchins: Confessions, September 2 – November 8 (solo)
New York, Junior Projects, Rock Hound Swap Meet, organized by Randy Wray, July 9 – August 13
New York, NY, Marianne Boesky Gallery, I Do Choose, May 9 – June 13 (solo)
New York, Jack Hanley Gallery, Zabriskie Point, January 9 – February 8

2014
Innsbruck, Austria, Galerie im Taxispalais, Living in the Material World, December 6, 2014 – February 15, 2015
Richmond, VA, Reynolds Gallery, Terra Firma, November 7 – December 24
Los Angeles, ACME, Ok Great Thanks This Is So Ridiculous, June 7 – July 12
Berlin, Germany, Johann König, Coming II, May 3 – May 24 (solo)
Krefeld, Germany, Museen Haus Lange Haus Esters, Living in the Material World, April 6 – October 8
Ridgefield, CT, The Aldrich Contemporary Art Museum, Unicorn, April 6 – September 21 (solo)
New York, The Highline, Archeo, April 2014 – March 2015
Milwaukee, WI, Green Gallery, No. 1 Rainbow, March 19 – April 27 (solo)
Portland, OR, Adams and Ollman, The Ground, March 7 – April 26
Amsterdam, Grimm Gallery, Trieste, organized by Jay Heikes, February 1 – March 15
London, UK, Timothy Taylor Gallery, January 31 – March 8 (solo)
East Lansing, MI, Eli and Edythe Broad Art Museum, Michigan State University, The Genres: Still Life Featuring Jessica Jackson Hutchins, December 13, 2013 – March 23, 2014 (solo)

2013
Cleveland, Museum of Contemporary Art Cleveland, The Suburban, November 1, 2013 – February 16, 2014
West Yorkshire, UK, Hepworth Wakefield Museum, Jessica Jackson Hutchins, February 16 – May 12 (solo)

2012 
 Rome, Brand New Gallery, Changing States of Matter, May 31 – July 28
 Rome, Federica Schiavo Gallery, Trieste, March 31 – June 23
 Brussels, Gladstone Gallery, Prima Materia, March 30 – April 28
 Stamford, Franklin Street Works, House Arrest, April 5 – June 20
 London, The Saatchi Gallery, Objectified: Sculpture Today

2011
Boston, MA, ICA Boston, Jessica Jackson Hutchins, October 28, 2011 – March 4 (solo)
Lyon, France, A Terrible Beauty is Born: 11th Biennale de Lyon, catalogue, September 15 – December 31 
New York, Laurel Gitlen, Ryan Foerster, Jessica Jackson Hutchins, Chadwick Rantanen, September 14 – October 23
Seattle, Seattle Art Museum, Reclaimed: Nature and Place Through Contemporary Eyes, June 30 – September 11
New York, Salon 94, Paul Clay, June 23 – August 12, 2011 
Atlanta, GA, Atlanta Contemporary Art Center, Jessica Jackson Hutchins: The Important Thing About a Chair, April 8 – June 19 (solo)
London, Museum 52, Memories Are Made Of This, April 7 – May 12, 2011 
Portland, OR, Elizabeth Leach Gallery, Here/Now, February 7 – April 2 
New York, Marianne Boesky Gallery, Dwelling, February 3 – April 2

2010
London, UK, Timothy Taylor Gallery, Champions, October 13 – November 6 (solo)
Portland, OR, Portland Institute for Contemporary Art, Children of the Sunshine, September 9 – October 17 (solo)
New York, NY, Laurel Gitlen, Over Come Over, February 21 – March 28 (solo)
New York, NY, Derek Eller Gallery, Kitchen Table Allegory, February 20 – March 28 (solo)
New York, Whitney Museum of American Art, The Whitney Biennial, 2010, catalogue, February 25 – May 30
Saratoga Springs, NY, The Tang Museum, The Jewel Thief, curated by Ian Barry and Jessica Stockholder, September 18 – February 27, 2011 
Greensboro, NC, The Weatherspoon Art Museum, Art of Paper 2010, November 7, 2010 – February 6, 2011 
Stockholm, Milliken Gallery, Face Your Demons, May 12 – June 24
Marylhurst, OR, Marylhurst University, Motherlode, April 19 – May 15
Seattle, Olympic Sculpture Park, Seattle Art Museum, Summer Projects, summer 2010
Seattle, Seattle Art Museum, Kurt, May 13 – September 9

2009 
 Seattle, Western Bridge, Parenthesis, September 25 – December 29
 Philadelphia, Institute of Contemporary Art at the University of Pennsylvania, Dirt on Delight, April 16 – June 21; travelled to Minneapolis, The Dirt On Delight: Impulses That Form Clay, catalogue, July 11 – November 29
 Portland, OR, The Oregon College of Art and Craft, Bent 
 New York, On Stellar Rays, LOVER, June 20 – July 26 
 New York, David Nolan, Slough, curated by Steve DiBenedetto, May 28 – July 24
 Santa Barbara, Santa Barbara Contemporary Arts Forum, An Expanded Field of Possibilities, February 28 – May 24 
 New York, Momenta Art, The Mood Back Home, February 13 – March 16
 New York, Laurel Gitlen, ARE YOU WITH ME?, January 4 – February 8

2008
 Portland, OR, Small A Projects, Hours and Ours, 2008 (solo)
 Chicago, Rowley Kennerk, Presents, curated by Milwaukee International, December 19, 2008 – January 24, 2009 
 New York, Laurel Gitlen, 200597214100022008, September 12 – October 5, 2008 
 New York, White Columns, Begin Again Right Back There, curated by B. Wurtz, September 10 – October 25, 2008 
 Portland, OR, PDX Contemporary Art, Kinda Like A Buffet, July 1 – August 2, 2008 
 New York, CANADA, Journey to the Center of Uranus, July 11 – August 10, 2008 
 New York, Derek Eller Gallery, Summer Group Exhibition, July 10 – August 15, 2008
 New York, NY, Derek Eller Gallery, The Exponent of Earth (You Make Me __), May 15 – July 3 (solo)

2007
Portland, OR, Eric V. Hauser Memorial Library, Reed College, Case Works 12: Stylite Optimism (solo)
Orange, CA, Chapman University, Home/Office Landscapes 
New York, Southfirst Gallery, Michelle Grabner's Never Quite Happy Home, September 14 – October 28
Oak Park, IL, Shane Campbell Gallery, Ceramics 
New York, Derek Eller Gallery, Neo-Integrity, curated by Keith Mayerson, July 17 – August 24 
Ferndale, MI, Paul Kotula Projects, Hump 
Milawaukee, INOVA, Peck School of the Arts, University of Wisconsin, Place of the Transcommon, curated by Nicholas Frank, February 2 – March 16, 2008

2006
Portland, OR, Small A Projects, Peace at Home: The War Never Left (solo) 
New York, Derek Eller Gallery, Summer Group Exhibition, June 29 - August 13 
New York, Alexandre Gallery, Your Beauty's Gold is Clay, June 28 – August 4 
Portland, OR, Small A Projects, Atlas of the Unknown, 2006 
New York, Derek Eller Gallery, Jessica Jackson Hutchins Relics from a Lonely Dinner, February 9 - March 11 
Philadelphia, Institute for Contemporary Art at the University of Pennsylvania, Gone Formalism, January 21 – March 26
New York, Derek Eller Gallery, Inaugural Group Exhibition, January 12 - February 4
Portland, OR, an event for Ghosttown with Red76, Lonely Dinner

2005 
 New York, The Sculpture Center, Make it Now, catalogue, May 15 – July 31 
 Frankfurt am Main, Germany, Parisa Kind Gallery, International Laundry 
 New York, EFA, I live in a Castle, curated by Jessica Hutchins and Dan Torop

2004
 New York, Derek Eller Gallery, March 18 – April 17 (solo)
 New York, Champion Fine Art, Escapism: a viable political alternative, curated by Fia Backström, July 22 – August 20 
 London, Anthony Wilkinson Gallery, Five Friends, a film and video 22 program 
 New York, Debs & Co., Art Star/Sausage Factory, April 15 – May 8 
 New York, Lombard-Freid Fine Art, Surface Tension, 2004 
 Kent, UK, Herbert Read Gallery, Ascend to the End

Collections
Hutchins's work is included in the collections of: 
 Brooklyn Museum, New York 
 The Hammer Museum, Los Angeles 
 The Museum of Modern Art, New York 
 Portland Art Museum, OR 
 Tang Museum, Saratoga Springs, NY 
 Seattle Art Museum, WA 
 Whitney Museum of American Art, New York

Publications 
 "Confessions" was commissioned as part of Jessica's two-space exhibition of the same name at the lumber room and the Douglas F. Cooley Memorial Art Gallery, Reed College. It was designed by Jessica Jackson Hutchins, Gary Robbins, and Heather Watkins and published by Container Corps in 2015.
 "Jessica Jackson Hutchins: Everything Erblaut" was published in 2013 by the Timothy Taylor Gallery and The Hepworth Wakefield.  Kirsty Bell and Colin Lang are contributors (text), with design help from the Purtill Family Business.
 "Convivium" was a collaboration of the visual arts of Hutchins and poetry of Tom Fisher.  Published by Publication Studio, 2010. 
 Featured in the BOMB Magazine, edition no. 112 (Summer), in 2010, with an interview by Stuart Horodner.

External links
Artist Talk with Jessica Jackson Hutchins.  On January 13, Jessica Jackson Hutchins lead a discussion about Philip Guston's painting "Untitled" (1969). Portland Art Museum. https://www.youtube.com/watch?v=1jIxYpxULbo
Guest DJ Project: Jessica jackson Hutchins. KCRW. Host: Chris Douridas. http://www.kcrw.com/music/shows/guest-dj-project/jessica-jackson-hutchins
Jessica Jackson Hutchins Artist Talk. Eli and Edythe Broad Art Museum. https://vimeo.com/86584638
Jessica Jackson Hutchins, Alice Channer, Linder Sterling. An introduction to three new exhibitions at The Hepworth Wakefield: Jessica Jackson Hutchins, Alice Channer and Linder, from 16 February - 12 May 2013. https://www.youtube.com/watch?v=qksqkiBlFEg Published on Feb 28, 2013. https://vimeo.com/61104448
The MoE presents The Salon of Everything // Venice Biennale 2013 // The Pros and Cons of Inclusion. An in-depth examination of inclusion and exclusion in the art world, led by Professor Andrew Renton, with contemporary artists Alice Anderson and Jessica Jackson Hutchins and Bose Krishnamachari and Swetal Patel, directors of the 2012 Kochi Biennale in India. Museum of Everything.  https://www.youtube.com/watch?v=RfUSR1xaKt8 Published on Dec 1, 2014 https://vimeo.com/77575328
10 Questions: Jessica Jackson Hutchins. School of Doodle. https://www.youtube.com/watch?v=yDe-D-y7z14 Published on Apr 11, 2016
Convivium. A collaboration between visual artist Hutchins and poet Tom Fisher, comprising photographs of Hutchins's sculpture, texts written by Fisher, and fragments of other texts selected by Fisher and Hutchins. https://web.archive.org/web/20160508021504/http://www.publicationstudio.biz/books/29
Biography

References  

1971 births
Living people
American women ceramists
American ceramists
21st-century American artists
Oberlin College alumni
Artists from Chicago
20th-century American artists
Artists from Portland, Oregon
School of the Art Institute of Chicago alumni
21st-century American women artists
21st-century ceramists
20th-century American women